Moolort station was opened on 7 July 1874. There is no longer a station platform at Moolort (it was shortened from 61.5m to 18.3m in length in 1973). However, there are still sidings provided to grain silos and to ballast piles. On 17 December 2004, the line from Moolort to Maldon Junction was closed, due to the line being reserved for the Victorian Goldfields Railway to operate between Maldon and Castlemaine. Ballast trains operate from Maryborough to Moolort.

References

External links
Railpage - Moolort Railway Station and Grain Silos
 Vicrail - Moolort
 Vicsig - Moolort
 Vicsig - Castlemaine
 Melway map at street-directory.com.au

Disused railway stations in Victoria (Australia)